The Bornholm amulet is a silver coin with Latin text written with runic inscription. The amulet is 2.5 cm in diameter.

Discovery
The finding place is unknown but the coin was handed over to the National Museum of Denmark in 1821, with information that the coin was found in the year 1770 on Bornholm.

Dating
The dating of the amulet was at first considered to be between 907 and 913. In 1965, the dating was revised to be between 885 and 896.

Inscription
The height of the runes are 0,3-0,8 cm.

Transliteration

Obverse; e(i) (e)asusus kristus= =fil=uis t(e)i fifi inomina b|atris eþ fil|ius ins eþ sb=iritu|s

Reverse; k=rist=us (b)i | bius=ank=uis fifiþ | fit=am itirn=a|m k=ustotaþit

Transcription

 ... Iesus Christus filius dei vivi. In nomina patris et filii ... et spiritus. Christus ... pius sanguis vivit, vitam aeternam custodiat.

English translation

 ... Jesus Christ, son of the living God. In the name of the Father, the Son ... and Spirit. Christ ... the gracious blood is living, may it preserve eternal life.

The inscription may very well be the oldest example of so-called Runic Latin in Denmark.

See also
 Curmsun Disc
 Jelling stones

References 

9th century in Denmark
9th-century inscriptions
10th-century inscriptions
1770 archaeological discoveries
1821 archaeological discoveries
Amulets
Archaeological discoveries in Denmark
Archaeological discoveries in Europe
Bornholm
Medieval Christian inscriptions
Medieval Latin inscriptions
Runic inscriptions
Silver coins
Viking Age in Denmark